Danijel Premerl (23 January 1904 – 1 October 1975) was a Croatian football player. He was one of few players to play for all four major Zagreb clubs prior to the Second World War. He was part of Yugoslavia's team at the 1928 Summer Olympics. He is buried in Mirogoj Cemetery.

International career
Premerl made his debut for Kingdom of Yugoslavia in an October 1925 friendly match away against Czechoslovakia and earned a total of 29 caps, scoring 1 goal. His final international was a June 1932 Balkan Cup match against Bulgaria.

References

External links
 
Nogometni leksikon, Miroslav Krleža Lexicographical Institute.
  Serbian national football team website

1904 births
1975 deaths
People from Krapina
Association football defenders
Yugoslav footballers
Yugoslavia international footballers
Olympic footballers of Yugoslavia
Footballers at the 1928 Summer Olympics
HAŠK players
HŠK Concordia players
HŠK Građanski Zagreb players
Yugoslav First League players
Burials at Mirogoj Cemetery